Jade Dynasty may refer to:

 Zhu Xian (novel) or Jade Dynasty, a Chinese novel
 Jade Dynasty (video game), adapted from the novel
Jade Dynasty (film), adapted from the novel
 Sparkle Roll, formerly called Jade Dynasty